Kreder is a surname. Notable people with the surname include:

Michel Kreder (born 1987), Dutch road racing cyclist
Raymond Kreder (born 1989), Dutch road racing cyclist
Wesley Kreder (born 1990), Dutch road racing cyclist

See also
Kreher
Kremer
Reder